Hypochlora alba, known generally as mugwort grasshopper, is a species of spur-throated grasshopper in the family Acrididae. Other common names include the sage grasshopper and cudweed grasshopper. It is found in North America. It feeds exclusively on Artemisia ludoviciana.

References

External links

 

Melanoplinae
Insects described in 1876
Orthoptera of North America